Unreal Championship is a first-person arena shooter video game developed by Epic Games and Digital Extremes, published by Infogrames, and released for the Xbox. Part of the Unreal franchise, Unreal Championship is the console version of Unreal Tournament 2003, and was developed to take advantage of Xbox Live. The game is notable for being the first ever console game to receive a downloadable patch. In 2003 Unreal Championship was added to the Xbox "Platinum Hits" line. 

A direct sequel, Unreal Championship 2: The Liandri Conflict, was released in 2005.

Gameplay
Deathmatch
Team Deathmatch
Capture the Flag
Double Domination – In Double Domination, both teams must control two points on the map for ten seconds in order to score. A point can be taken by walking into its symbol, A or B. NPCs can be ordered to go to a certain point.
Survival — 1 vs 1 deathmatch with more players than usual. As each round ends, the losing player is made to join a queue of spectators, while the winner remains in the game until killed. The winner is the first player to reach a predetermined score.
Bombing Run – Unreal-style football where the player's team must score by placing the ball in the enemy force's goal. The bombing gun regenerates health as the offensive player moves, giving him additional lifespan to reach the enemy goal. Once the enemy goal is reached, the offensive player can run into it to score seven points for their team. Shooting the bomb into the enemy goal earns three points.

Reception 

The game received "generally favorable" reviews, according to video game review aggregator Metacritic. It was nominated for GameSpots annual "Best Online Game" and "Best Shooter" awards among Xbox games, both of which went to MechAssault.

References

External links
 

Unreal (video game series)
2002 video games
Xbox games
First-person shooters
Arena shooters
Multiplayer online games
Video games developed in Canada
Video games developed in the United States
Xbox-only games
Unreal Engine games
Video games about death games
Atari games
Infogrames games
Epic Games games